Ricardo Tonieto (born 22 March 1962) is a Brazilian water polo player. He competed in the men's tournament at the 1984 Summer Olympics.

References

1962 births
Living people
Brazilian male water polo players
Olympic water polo players of Brazil
Water polo players at the 1984 Summer Olympics
Water polo players from São Paulo